"The Ragtime Soldier Man" is a World War I era song released in 1912 and 1917. Irving Berlin wrote the lyrics and composed the music, basing it off his 1911 song "Alexander's Ragtime Band". The song was published by Waterson, Berlin & Snyder, Co. of New York, New York. Artist Pfeiffer designed the sheet music cover. It features a U.S. soldier holding his rifle and jumping over cannon balls. The song was written for voice and piano.

Arthur Collins and Byron G. Harlan recorded the song and it was released in 1912 by Victor Records and Columbia Records. It was also recorded by Edward Meeker in 1913 for Edison Records.

The sheet music can be found at Pritzker Military Museum & Library.

Chorus
The song is about a soldier eager to leave his sweetheart and fight in the war. He tells her to stop grieving, and understand that he has to fight for "love and liberty." The choruses are as follows:

Chorus:

Earlier version of the chorus:

Another earlier version of the chorus:

References

1912 songs
Songs written by Irving Berlin
Songs about soldiers
Songs about the military
Songs of World War I
Ragtime